George Johann Klein,  (August 15, 1904 – November 4, 1992) was a Hamilton, Ontario-born Canadian inventor who is often called the most productive inventor in Canada in the 20th century. Although he struggled as a high school student, he eventually graduated from the University of Toronto in Mechanical Engineering. His inventions include key contributions to the first electric wheelchairs for quadriplegics, the first microsurgical staple gun, the ZEEP nuclear reactor which was the precursor to the CANDU reactor, the international system for classifying ground-cover snow, aircraft skis, the Weasel all-terrain vehicle, the STEM antenna for the space program, and the Canadarm.

Klein worked for forty years as a mechanical engineer at the National Research Council of Canada laboratories in Ottawa (1929–1969).

In 1968, he was made an Officer of the Order of Canada. In 1995, he was inducted to the Canadian Science and Engineering Hall of Fame.

References 
Notes

Bibliography

 Bourgeois-Doyle, Richard I. George J. Klein: The Great Inventor. Ottawa: NRC Research Press, 2004. .

External links 
 George J. Klein at Canadian Science and Technology Museum Hall of Fame
 Canadian Science and Technology Museum Virtual Program at Canadian Science and Technology Museum 
 
 George J. Klein at CDC
 NRC Archives Photos -     George Klein Wheel Chair 
 

1904 births
1992 deaths
20th-century Canadian inventors
People from Hamilton, Ontario
Canadian Members of the Order of the British Empire
Officers of the Order of Canada
Canadian people of German descent
Manhattan Project people